Juan Garriga (born 18 September 1940) is a Spanish alpine skier. He competed in three events at the 1964 Winter Olympics.

References

1940 births
Living people
Spanish male alpine skiers
Olympic alpine skiers of Spain
Alpine skiers at the 1964 Winter Olympics
Sportspeople from Barcelona
20th-century Spanish people